Blastobasis rotullae is a moth in the  family Blastobasidae. It is found in Costa Rica.

The length of the forewings is 4.2–5.9 mm. The forewings are pale brown intermixed with brown scales or with brownish-grey scales tipped with pale brown intermixed with pale-brown scales. The hindwings are translucent brownish grey gradually darkening towards the apex.

Etymology
The specific name is derived from Latin rotulla (meaning little wheel).

References

Moths described in 2013
Blastobasis